David Valle Millán (born 27 May 1978 in Barcelona, Catalonia) is a Spanish retired footballer who played as a goalkeeper, and the current goalkeeping coach of Extremadura UD.

External links

1978 births
Living people
Footballers from Barcelona
Spanish footballers
Association football goalkeepers
Segunda División players
Segunda División B players
UDA Gramenet footballers
UE Cornellà players
Terrassa FC footballers
Hércules CF players
Córdoba CF players
Polideportivo Ejido footballers
CF Badalona players
Gimnàstic de Tarragona footballers